Arthur Ellis may refer to:

People
 Arthur Ayres Ellis (1830–1887), English academic
 Sir Arthur Ellis (British Army officer) (1837–1907), British Army general and courtier
 Arthur Edward Ellis (1914–1999), English football referee
 Arthur Ellis (rugby union) (born 1990), English rugby union player
 Arthur Ellis (Canadian politician) (1890–1964), Canadian politician
 Arthur Ellis (Maryland politician) (born 1961), American politician
 Arthur B. English (1864/1865–1938), Canada's official hangman who used the pseudonym Arthur Ellis, as did some of his successors
 Arthur Erskine Ellis (1902–1983), British scientist, biologist and naturalist

Other uses
 Arthur Ellis Awards, Canadian awards presented to writers of crime fiction and true crime